Lucas Andrés Colitto (born 1 June 1994), is an Argentine professional footballer who plays as a winger for Deportivo Cuenca.

Career
Born in San Martín, Buenos Aires, Colitto began his career with Defensores de Belgrano. He made his professional debut on the 4 August 2012, in away fixture against Atlanta. Colitto would score his first goal for Defensores de Belgrano on the 27 October 2012, against Flandria.

In the summer of 2014, Colitto left the Buenos Aires outfit to join Portuguese side F.C. Arouca. Colitto debuted for the Arouquenses on the 31 August 2014 in a 2–0 away loss to C.D. Nacional.

References

External links

1994 births
Living people
Sportspeople from Buenos Aires Province
Argentine footballers
Argentine expatriate footballers
Association football forwards
Defensores de Belgrano footballers
F.C. Arouca players
Unión de Santa Fe footballers
C.S. Herediano footballers
Club Atlético Fénix players
Club Atlético Atlanta footballers
Barracas Central players
C.D. Cuenca footballers
Primeira Liga players
Primera B Metropolitana players
Primera Nacional players
Liga FPD players
Expatriate footballers in Portugal
Expatriate footballers in Costa Rica
Expatriate footballers in Ecuador
Argentine expatriate sportspeople in Portugal
Argentine expatriate sportspeople in Costa Rica
Argentine expatriate sportspeople in Ecuador